The 2015 European Cup Winter Throwing was held on 14 and 15 March at the Centro Nacional de Lançamentos (National Throws Centre) and Estádio Municipal in Leiria, Portugal. It was the fifteenth edition of the athletics competition for throwing events and was jointly organised by the European Athletic Association and the Federação Portuguesa de Atletismo. The competition featured men's and women's contests in shot put, discus throw, javelin throw and hammer throw. In addition to the senior competitions, there were also under-23 events for younger athletes. Leiria repeated as host, becoming the first place to do so in tournament history.

During the competition the results were provided on a live mode, using Lap2Go technology

Medal summary

Senior

Under-23

Medal and points table
Key

References

Results
15th European Cup Winter Throwing, Estadio Municipal Dr. Magalhães Pessoa Leiria  POR  14 - 15 March. European Athletics. Retrieved on 2015-03-28.

External links
Official website

European Throwing Cup
European Cup Winter Throwing
Winter Throwing
International athletics competitions hosted by Portugal
Sport in Leiria